Mecoprop (also known as methylchlorophenoxypropionic acid and MCPP) is a common general use herbicide found in many household weed killers and "weed-and-feed" type lawn fertilizers. It is primarily used to control broadleaf weeds. It is often used in combination with other chemically related herbicides such as 2,4-D, dicamba, and MCPA.

The United States Environmental Protection Agency has classified mecoprop as toxicity class III - slightly toxic.

Mecoprop is a mixture of two stereoisomers, with the (R)-(+)-enantiomer ("Mecoprop-P", "Duplosan KV") possessing the herbicidal activity.

See also 
 Clofibric acid
 Phenoxy herbicides

References

External links 
 Mecoprop Pesticide Information Profile - Extension Toxicology Network
 
 

Auxinic herbicides
Chloroarenes
Carboxylic acids